Underwood is a community in the Regional Municipality of York in  Markham, Ontario, Canada that is located at the corner of Warden Ave between Birchmount Road and Steeles Avenue, north up to Hwy 7. Underwood is considered part of Downtown and Uptown Markham. It is likely considered to be part of Milliken.

The former farm land disappeared in the 1980s and is now occupied by single family homes. The north edge of the area is occupied by commercial parks.

The place is named for Underwood, Nottinghamshire in England.

References

Neighbourhoods in Markham, Ontario
1805 establishments in Upper Canada